Chai Rong (27 October 921 – 27 July 959), later known as Guo Rong, also known by his temple name as the Emperor Shizong of Later Zhou, was the second emperor of the Later Zhou dynasty of China, during the Five Dynasties and Ten Kingdoms period. He reigned from 954 until his death in 959. He succeeded his uncle-in-law Guo Wei, whose surname he had adopted.

Emperor Shizong is considered a highly successful emperor of the Five Dynasties period. He centralized military power by his reforms, and proved his military prowess by a series of victories against Northern Han, Later Shu, Southern Tang, and the Liao dynasty. Although his accomplishments were limited due to his premature death, they paved the way for the eventual unification of large parts of China proper by the Northern Song, founded by his trusted generals Zhao Kuangyin and Zhao Guangyi.

Family
Parents
Father: Chai Shouli (柴守禮) (biological)
Wives
Empress Zhen, of the Liu clan (貞惠皇后 劉氏;?–951)
Empreas Xuanyi, of the Fu clan (宣懿符皇后;931 – 29 August 956), daughter of Fu Yanqing (符彥卿)
Empress Xiaofu, of the Fu clan (小符皇后;933－993, daughter of Fu Yanqing (符彥卿)
Unknown:
Chai Zongyi (柴宗誼; 10th century?- 24 December 950), first son
Chai Cheng (柴誠; 10th century -24 December 950), second son
Chai Xian, Prince of Han (韓王 柴諴; 10th century – 24 December 950), third son 
Chai Zongxun, Prince of Liang (梁王 柴宗訓; 14 September 953 - 6 April 1973), fourth son
Chai Xirang (柴熙讓), fifth son
Chai Xijing (柴熙謹), sixth son
Chai Xihui (柴熙誨), seventh son

Early life
Chai Rong was born in Xingzhou (邢州; modern Xingtai, Hebei). As a child he came to live with his aunt — a younger sister of his father Chai Shouli — and her husband Guo Wei, an official in the Later Tang military. The Guos had no sons, so they adopted the quiet nephew as their own. The youngster grew up into a muscular young man skilled at mounted archery, while also possessing a basic understanding of Chinese classics, history, and the Huang-Lao philosophy. When he was an adult, he handled household affairs for Guo Wei, and often went out to do business, traveling back and forth between the Central China and the Jiangnan area.

Career under Later Han 
After the establishment of the Later Han in 947, the Guo family's condition improved dramatically. Guo Wei became the Commissioner of Military Affairs in 948, and his adopted son became the Left Commandant for Palace-gate Security. On 4 May 950, Guo was promoted to military governor of Tianxiong Command and delegated to garrison at Weizhou (魏州; modern Linzhang County, Hebei) at the Later Han-Liao dynasty border to prevent a possible Liao incursion. Ten days later, his adopted son was appointed Tianxiong Command's Chief Director of Military Headquarters to follow him in Weizhou. Chai Rong — by now known as Guo Rong — was also given a nominal post of prefect of Guizhou.

In 950, the Later Han emperor Liu Chengyou unexpectedly killed the entire family of Guo Wei as a plot to liquidate the most powerful ministers in his nation. Guo Wei decided to rebel. As Guo Rong's wife Lady Liu and children including 3 young sons also remained in the capital Bianzhou (汴州; today's Kaifeng, Henan), they were all slaughtered as well. Guo Wei asked Guo Rong to stay behind at the frontier as he led his main army southbound towards Bianzhou.

Career under Emperor Taizu of Later Zhou
In a few months, Liu Chengyou was killed, Later Han was terminated, as Guo Wei founded the Later Zhou. Guo Rong became the military governor of Zhenning Command and went to Chanzhou (澶州; today's Qingfeng County, Henan). At Chanzhou, he quickly eradicated militarized outlaws in the region and promoted literati to enforce laws more effectively, winning the support of the people. He also initiated projects to tear down dilapidated street walls and build new public office buildings and residential housings.

Chancellor Wang Jun, the most powerful minister, did not see eye-to-eye with Guo Rong on some issues and prevented him from visiting the capital on more than one occasion. In 952, Guo Rong requested permission to lead an army to quell a rebellion, but Wang Jun vetoed it for fear that Guo Rong would hold too much military power. At the end, Guo Wei had to personally lead the troops as an emperor. It was not until Wang's banishment in early 953 that Guo Rong finally got a chance to come back to the capital, when in April 953 he was named Prince of Jin. By this time he was again married, to a Lady Fu, a widowed daughter of general Fu Yanqing. His son Chai Zongxun was born in late 953 in Chanzhou.

Emperor of Later Zhou
Guo Rong (posthumously known as Shizong of Later Zhou) became emperor in 954 upon his adoptive father's death.  Like his father, he was considered an able ruler.  He continued reforms introduced by his father.  More importantly, he began putting pressure on the Northern Han and even the Liao dynasty, though nothing substantial came of it.  More success was met in the south as some minor successes were made against the Southern Tang and Later Shu, paving the way to eventual unification by the Song dynasty.

Campaign against Liu Chong 
One month after Chai Rong took the throne, Liu Chong, Emperor of Northern Han, colluded with Liao dynasty to launch an assault on Later Zhou. Against the advice of Minister Feng Dao, Chai Rong decided to lead the army to fight against the incursion. When Chai Rong engaged Liu Chong at Gao Ping (in modern Jincheng, Shanxi), two of Chai's general Fan Aineng, He Hui fled from battlefield along with their troops. At this critical moment, Chai Rong risked his life to break through the defense and crushed Liu's forces. After this campaign, Chai Rong consolidated his power.

He suffered an early death at the age of 38 when he died from illness while out on the field in 959.  He left behind him a six-year-old heir to succeed him. This led to the fall of the dynasty and the rise of the Song dynasty, which eventually succeeded in reunifying China.

Notes

References

Citations

Sources 

 
  
  
  
  

921 births
959 deaths
Later Zhou emperors
10th-century Chinese adoptees
Politicians from Xingtai
Generals from Hebei
Persecution of Buddhists